The Asian Weightlifting Championships is a weightlifting championship organised by the Asian Weightlifting Federation for competitors from the Asian countries. It has been held since 1969 for men and 1988 for women. In 2008 the championships provided the official qualification for Asian competitors in the 2008 Beijing Olympics.

List tournaments

Notes

See also
Weightlifting at the Asian Games

External links
Official AWF website
Weightlifting Database

 
Weightlifting
Weightlifting in Asia
Weightlifting competitions
Recurring sporting events established in 1969